The Bakhar Formation (Russian: Bakhar Svita) is a geological formation in  Mongolia whose strata date back to the Aalenian to Bathonian stages of the Middle Jurassic, comprising claystones deposited in a lacustrine environment.

Fossil content 
Insects; Platyperla propera, 
Ano da, A. net, A. nym, Blattula anuniversala, B. bacharensis, B. flamma, B. mikro, B. mini, B. universala, B. velika, B. vulgara, Caloblattina vremeni, Dostavba pre, Hra disko, H. bavi, H. nie, Nuurcala cela, Okras sarko, Perlucipecta cosmopolitana, Polliciblattula analis, P. tatosanerata, P. vana, Praeblattella jurassica, Raphidiomima chimnata, R. krajka, Rhipidoblattina bakharensis, R. konserva, R. sisnerahkab, Solemnia togokhudukhensis, Truhla vekov, fish (Palaeonisciformes) and pterosaur remains of the family Anurognathidae have been recovered from the formation. The formation has also provided many fossil flora in its coal layers, known as the Tsagan-Ovoo Flora containing 32 megafossil plant taxa belonging to horsetails, ferns, cycadaleans, ginkgoaleans, leptostrobaleans, conifers and gymnosperms. Three new species were named; Ginkgo badamgaravii, Pseudotorellia gobiense and P. mongolica.

See also 
 List of pterosaur-bearing stratigraphic units
 Balabansai Formation, contemporaneous fossiliferous formation of Central Asia
 Itat Formation, contemporaneous fossiliferous formation of Russia
 Ukureyskaya Formation, contemporaneous fossiliferous formation of Russia
 Tiaojishan Formation, contemporaneous fossiliferous formation of China

References

Bibliography 

   
 
 
 
 

Geologic formations of Mongolia
Jurassic System of Asia
Jurassic Mongolia
Aalenian Stage
Bajocian Stage
Bathonian Stage
Shale formations
Coal formations
Coal in Mongolia
Lacustrine deposits
Paleontology in Mongolia